Jorge de Freitas Antunes (born 23 April 1942) is a Brazilian composer of electroacoustic and acousmatic music. Jorge Antunes is an Avant-garde composer, who is known as the man who pioneered electronic music in Brazil. 

Born in Rio de Janeiro, Antunes entered the Escola de Música da Universidade Federal do Rio de Janeiro in 1959 where he studied violin. He went on to earn Master of Music degrees in both violin and composition from the Federal University of Rio de Janeiro and a Doctor of Music in electroacoustic music from the University of Paris (1977).

Biography
In 1973, Antunes became a professor at the University of Brasilia. He directs the Laboratory of Electroacoustic Music and teaches Composition and Musical Acoustics.

Selected works

Opera
 Contato (1968)
 Vivaldia MCMLXXV, chamber opera buffa (1975)
 Qorpo Santo, opera in three acts (1983)
 O rei de uma nota só (The Single-tone King), mini-opera in four scenes (1991)
 A borboleta azul (The Blue Butterfly), mini-opera in two acts (1995)
 Olga (composed 1987–97, premiered 2006)

Chamber music
 Mascaruncho for two violas (1977)
 Microformóbiles I for viola and piano (1970)
 Modinha para Mindinha (Tune for Mindinha) for seven violas (1985)

Discography

Paul Gutama Soegijo / Jorge Antunes / Peter Schat / Junsang Bahk - IGNM - SIMC - ISCM / Musikprotokoll 1972 / Steirischer Herbst '72 / 9 10 17 10 ‎(LP, Promo)
Internationale Gesellschaft für Neue Musik - Sektion Österreich, Internationale Gesellschaft für Neue Musik - Sektion Österreich, ORF, ORF
0120045, 0120 045
1973

Música Eletrônica 

2 versions
E. S. Mangione
1975

Catastrofe Ultra-Violeta / Isomerism ‎(LP)
Sistrum
LPS 3001
1976

!No Se Mata La Justicia! ‎(LP)
Sistrum
LPS 3002
1981

Jorge Antunes e o GeMUnB - Jorge Antunes e o GeMUnB ‎(CD, Album)
UnB Discos
CD 350010
2002

!No Se Mata La Justicia! ‎(CD, Album)
Paulinas COMEP
CD 11807-9
2003

Música De Câmara II ‎(CD, Album)
Sistrum Edições Musicais Ltda.
CDST008
2010

Música De Câmara I ‎(CD, Album)
Sistrum Edições Musicais Ltda.
CDST007
2010

Coloratus ‎(CDr, Album)
ABM Digital, Academia Brasileira De Música
none
2011

In Defense Of The Machine ‎(CD)
Pogus Productions
21067-2
2013

Cordas Dedilhadas ‎(2xCD, Album)
Selo SESC SP
CDSS 0132/19
2020

Singles & EPs

Musica Electronica 70's I ‎(CD, Mini)
Sistrum Edições Musicais Ltda.
CD ST 001
1994

Musica Electronica 70's II ‎(CD, Mini)
Sistrum Edições Musicais Ltda.
CD ST 002
1995

Musica Electronica 90's I ‎(CD, Mini)
Sistrum Edições Musicais Ltda.
CD ST 004
1998

Compilations

Música Eletroacústica - Periodo Do Pioneirismo 
2 versions
ABM Digital, Academia Brasileira De Música
2002

References

External links
 Official site 

1942 births
Living people
Brazilian classical composers
Male opera composers
Electroacoustic music composers
Brazilian opera composers
Male classical composers
20th-century Brazilian musicians
21st-century Brazilian musicians
20th-century male musicians
21st-century male musicians